"Pink + White" is a song by American R&B singer Frank Ocean, released as a part of his 2016 studio album Blonde. The song was written and produced by Ocean and American record producer Pharrell Williams. The song features additional vocals by American singer Beyoncé. The track charted at number 84 on the Billboard Hot 100 chart, despite not being released as a single.

Background

Ocean had worked with Beyoncé since early in his career, co-writing "I Miss You" (2011) and collaborating on "Superpower" (2013). Producer Pharrell Williams, who also produced "Superpower", had previously worked with Ocean on "Sweet Life" and "Golden Girl" from Ocean's debut studio album Channel Orange.

Composition
The track speaks of a past romantic relationship, where every time the couple would "peak" things would turn out bad. The song is in 6/8 time in the key of A, with a tempo of 160 beats per minute.

Use in Popular Culture
A cover version by Ramin Djawadi was used in Westworld season 4.

Used at the end of S9EP6 of Shameless (US)

Personnel

 Frank Ocean – production
 Pharrell Williams – production, keyboards, drum programming, bass
 Jon Brion – string arrangement
 Benjamin Wright – string arrangement
 Beyoncé Knowles-Carter – additional vocals
 Eric Gorfain – violin concertmaster
 Daphne Chen – violin
 Marisa Kuney – violin
 Charlie Bisharat – violin
 Katie Sloan – violin
 Songa Lee – violin
 Gina Kronstadt – violin
 Lisa Dondlinger – violin
 Terry Glenny – violin
 Chris Woods – violin
 Neel Hammond – violin
 Marcy Vaj – violin
 Crystal Alforque – violin
 Leah Katz – viola
 Rodney Wirtz – viola
 Stefan Smith – viola
 Adriana Zoppo – viola
 John Krovoza – cello
 Wolf Haley - cello
 Simon Huber – cello
 Ginger Murphy – cello
 Alisha Bauer – cello
 Stefanie Fife – cello
 Greg Keller – strings recording
 Eric Caudieux – strings recording

Charts

Certifications

References

Frank Ocean songs
2016 songs
Songs written by Frank Ocean
Songs written by Pharrell Williams